Zabrus graecus is a species of ground beetle in the Pelor subgenus that is endemic to Greece.

Subspecies
There are four subspecies of Z. graecus:
 Z. graecus convexus C. Zimmermann, 1831
 Z. graecus graecus Dejean, 1828
 Z. graecus orientalis Apfelbeck, 1904
 Z. graecus subtilis Schaum, 1862

References

Beetles described in 1828
Beetles of Europe
Endemic fauna of Greece
Zabrus